The 2018 Klasika Primavera was the 64th edition of the Klasika Primavera, a one-day road cycling race, held on 8 April 2018. It was part of the 2018 UCI Europe Tour as a category 1.1 event.

Teams
Fourteen teams started the race. Each team had a maximum of seven riders:

Result

References

Klasika Primavera
2018 UCI Europe Tour
2018 in Spanish road cycling